Henry Cockshutt (July 8, 1868 – November 26, 1944) was the 13th Lieutenant Governor of Ontario, Canada.

Born in Brantford, Ontario, a son of Ignatius Cockshutt and Elizabeth Foster, he started in the family business, Cockshutt Plow Company, in 1884, becoming treasurer in 1888, secretary-treasurer in 1891, and president in 1911. In 1889, he was elected to Brantford City Council as an alderman and was elected mayor in 1899. In 1906 he was president of the Canadian Manufacturers' Association. He fought during World War I with the rank of lieutenant-colonel.

In the 1917 federal election he ran unsuccessfully as an independent candidate in the riding of Brant. He lost to the Government candidate, John Harold. In 1921, he was appointed lieutenant-governor of Ontario and served as King George V's representative until 1927. From 1929 to 1944, he served as chancellor of the University of Western Ontario. In 1934, he retired as president of the Cockshutt Plow Company and became chairman of the board, which he held until his death.

In 1896, he married Isabelle Rolls. They had two daughters, Margaret Elizabeth and Katherine Isabelle. He died November 26, 1944, and is buried in the Farringdon Burial Ground, Brant County. His mansion, Dufferin House, in Brantford, became the campus for St John's College School. In the early 1970s, the private Catholic school moved to another location and the former estate was demolished and the property sold. The grounds of Dufferin House are now the site of a condominium development.

Today, you can find Cockshutt Park located in West Brant, which has batting cages, a playground, and four baseball diamonds, including Arnold Anderson Stadium, home of the Brantford Red Sox.

Electoral record

External links
 The Lieutenant Governor of Ontario biography

1868 births
1944 deaths
Lieutenant Governors of Ontario
Mayors of Brantford
Chancellors of the University of Western Ontario
Canadian military personnel of World War I